Kal Gavrah (also Romanized as Kal Gāvrāh; also known as Kalleh Gāvrāh, Kalleh Gāvrā, Kalleh Gāv Rāh, Kala Gaurāh, Kala Gāvreh, Kal-e Gowrā, Kaleh Gāvar, and Kalgūrā) is a village in Kuhdasht-e Jonubi Rural District, in the Central District of Kuhdasht County, Lorestan Province, Iran. At the 2006 census, its population was 143, in 29 families.

References 

Towns and villages in Kuhdasht County